The 1878 Rhode Island gubernatorial election was held on April 3, 1878. Incumbent Republican Charles C. Van Zandt defeated Democratic nominee Isaac Lawrence with 58.12% of the vote.

General election

Candidates
Major party candidates
Charles C. Van Zandt, Republican
Isaac Lawrence, Democratic 

Other candidates
William Foster Jr., Greenback

Results

References

1878
Rhode Island
Gubernatorial